Nathwani is a surname. Notable people with the surname include:

Narendra Nathwani (1913–?), Indian politician
Parimal Nathwani (born 1956), Indian politician and industrialist
Yadav Nathwani (born 1983), American politician

Indian surnames